The Jardin botanique de Cayenne is a botanical garden located at the end of the Avenue Charles de Gaulle, adjacent to the university, in Cayenne, French Guiana. The garden measures 3 hectares. Although the Conseil Général de la Guyane states that the garden, formerly the Jardin du Roi (King's Garden), was established in 1879, there are earlier references to a botanical garden in Cayenne. It now contains a statue of politician Gaston Monnerville (1897-1991).

See also 
 List of botanical gardens in France

References 

 Conseil Général de la Guyane - Environnement
 Conseil Général de la Guyane - Jardin botanique de Cayenne
 Culture.fr entry (French)
 

Cayenne
Cayenne, Jardin botanique de
Cayenne, Jardin botanique de
Natural history of French Guiana